"(Why Are We) Trapped?" is a song by avant-garde band King Missile. It was the second single from the band's 1992 album Happy Hour.

Content
In "(Why Are We) Trapped?," a psychedelic rock track with prominent lead guitar, frontman John S. Hall sings variants of the question, "Why are we trapped here in the dark so long?" to an unidentified captor. In the chorus, he insists, "We've done everything you told us to do," and demands, "Let us out."

Music video
The video for the edited version of "(Why Are We) Trapped?" was directed by George Seminara. In the video, the band plays while "trapped" in a dark, gloomy pit.

References

King Missile songs
Experimental rock songs
1993 singles
Atlantic Records singles
1992 songs
Songs written by Dave Rick
Songs written by John S. Hall
Songs written by Chris Xefos